Altafur Rahman Chowdhury is a Awami League politician and the former Member of Parliament of Sylhet-15.

Career
Chowdhury was elected to parliament from Sylhet-15 as an Awami League candidate in 1973.

Death
Chowdhury died on 21 November 2018.

References

Awami League politicians
2018 deaths
1st Jatiya Sangsad members